Generation company (GENCO) is a company responsible for power generation in Pakistan. They are owned by Water and Power Development Authority and are operated separately.

List of GENCOs
There are currently four GENCOs which are operated by WAPDA. They are:
 Jamshoro Power Company Limited, GENCO-I
 Central Power Generation Company Limited, GENCO-II
 Northern Power Generation Company Limited, GENCO-III
 Lakhra Power Generation Company Limited, GENCO-IV

References

Water and Power Development Authority
Types of business entity
Generation companies